The Bram Stoker Award for First Novel is an award presented by the Horror Writers Association (HWA) for "superior achievement" in horror writing for an author's first horror novel.

Winners and nominees

References 

First Novel
First book awards
Bram Stoker Award for Best First Novel winners
1987 establishments in the United States
Awards established in 1987
English-language literary awards